Union Square is a  public plaza bordered by Geary, Powell, Post and Stockton Streets in downtown San Francisco, California. "Union Square" also refers to the central shopping, hotel, and theater district that surrounds the plaza for several blocks. The area got its name because it was once used for Thomas Starr King rallies and support for the Union Army during the American Civil War, earning its designation as a California Historical Landmark.

Today, this one-block plaza and surrounding area is one of the largest collections of department stores, upscale boutiques, gift shops, art galleries, and beauty salons in the United States, making Union Square a major tourist destination and a well-known gathering place in downtown San Francisco. Grand hotels and small inns, as well as repertory, off-Broadway, and single-act theaters also contribute to the area's dynamic, 24-hour character.

The Dewey Monument is at the center of Union Square. It is a statue of Nike, the ancient Greek goddess of victory.

History

Union Square was originally a tall sand dune, and the square was later set aside to be made into a public park in 1850. Union Square got its name from the pro-Union rallies held there on the eve of the Civil War. The monument itself is also a tribute to the sailors of the United States Navy.

Union Square was built and dedicated by San Francisco's first American mayor John Geary in 1850 and is so named for the pro-Union rallies by Thomas Starr King that happened there before and during the United States Civil War. It also commemorates U.S. President William McKinley, who had been recently assassinated. Executed by Robert Aitken, the statue at the top of the monument, "Victory," was modeled after a voluptuous Danish-American stenographer and artist's model, Alma de Bretteville, who eventually married one of San Francisco's richest citizens. Another significant change happened between 1939 and 1941 when a large underground parking garage was built under the square; this meant the plaza's lawns, shrubs and the Dewey monument were now on the garage "roof." Designed by Timothy Pflueger, it was the world's first underground parking garage.

During the late 1970s, and through the 1980s and 1990s, the area became somewhat derelict as the homeless began to camp in the space. San Francisco's rowdy New Year's parties used to happen yearly at the plaza with some sort of civil disruption and rioting happening afterward. In early 1998 city planners began plans to renovate the plaza to create more paved surfaces for easier maintenance, with outdoor cafes, and more levels to the underground garage. Finally in late 2000, the park was partially closed down to renovate the park and the parking garage. On July 25, 2002, the park reopened and a ceremony was held with then Mayor Willie Brown. In 2004 Unwire Now, a company founded by entrepreneur Jaz Banga, launched a free Wi-Fi network in Union Square which was championed by Mayor Gavin Newsom.
Union Square hosts many public concerts and events. Public views of the square can be seen from surrounding high places such as the Sir Francis Drake Hotel, Macy's top floor, and the Grand Hyatt hotel. The Union Square Business Improvement District was founded in 1999 and focused primarily on cleaning and safety issues. The BID also deals with marketing, advocacy, streetscapes and capital improvement programs. The Union Square BID has been criticized by some as acting in a harassing manner toward homeless people at times, to deter them from being there.

Public art

At the center of Union Square stands the Dewey Monument, an  column on which stand a  statue of Nike, the ancient Greek Goddess of Victory. The monument is dedicated to Admiral George Dewey, a hero of the Spanish–American War for his victory at the Battle of Manila Bay in 1898. The monument was dedicated in 1903.

Beginning in 2009, painted heart sculptures from the Hearts in San Francisco public art installation have been installed in each of the four corners of the square.

Economy
The Tiffany Building is an 11-story,  building at Union Square; the bottom two floors contain a Tiffany & Co. store, while the upper floors contain offices. Cathay Pacific maintains its North America regional headquarters on the third floor of the Tiffany Building, The Cathay Pacific North America headquarters moved from Greater Los Angeles and opened in the Tiffany Building in 2005.

The only hotel actually located on Union Square is the Westin St. Francis hotel which is celebrated for its historic Magneta Grandfather Clock. It is believed to be the only hotel in the world that offers its guests, as a courtesy, a coin washing service. The process originated in 1938 at a time when high-society ladies wore white gloves that were easily tarnished during the exchange of money. It uses borax soap in an antiquated, manually-operated burnisher.

Nearby attractions

Union Square has also come to describe not just the plaza itself, but the general shopping, dining, and theater districts within the surrounding blocks. The Geary and Curran theaters one block west on Geary anchor the "theater district" and border the Tenderloin. Union Square is also home to San Francisco's TIX Bay Area, a half-priced ticket booth and Ticketmaster outlet. Run by Theatre Bay Area, tickets for most of San Francisco's performing arts can be purchased the day of the performance at a discounted rate.

At the end of Powell Street two blocks south, where the cable cars turn around beside Hallidie Plaza at Market Street, is a growing retail corridor that is connected to the SOMA district. Nob Hill, with its grand mansions, apartment buildings and hotels, stands to the northwest of Union Square. Directly northeast is Chinatown, with its famous dragon gate at Grant Avenue and Bush Street.

The city's historic French Quarter northeast of Union Square and centers on the Belden Place alleyway, between Bush and Pine Streets, and Claude Lane off Bush Street. This area has many open-air French Restaurants and Cafes. Every year the area is the site of the boisterous Bastille Day celebration, the nation's largest, and Bush Street is temporarily renamed "Buisson."

Directly east of the square off of Stockton Street is Maiden Lane, a short and narrow alley of exclusive boutiques and cafes that leads to the Financial District and boasts the Xanadu Gallery, San Francisco's only building designed by Frank Lloyd Wright—with its interior most notable for being the predecessor for New York City's Guggenheim Museum. The square is part of the Barbary Coast Trail, linking many San Francisco landmarks.

During Decembers, an ice skating rink and Christmas tree are set up for the holiday season.

Shopping

Over the years, Union Square became a popular shopping destination. Several department stores sit within the three-block radius of Union Square, including Neiman Marcus, Macy's, Saks Fifth Avenue, and Barneys New York. Bloomingdale's and Nordstrom anchor the nearby Westfield San Francisco Centre, a shopping mall built in 1988 on nearby Market Street.

A mix of upscale boutiques and popular retailers occupy many of the buildings surrounding Union Square. Among the luxury retailers that front Union Square are Louis Vuitton, Gucci, Bulgari, Loro Piana, Moncler, and jeweler Tiffany & Co.; while flagship Victoria's Secret, Williams Sonoma, Nike, and Apple stores also occupy buildings surrounding Union Square. Other notable brands in the surrounding area include Chanel, Prada, Burberry, Salvatore Ferragamo, Shapur Mozaffarian, Goyard, Dior and Cartier.

Gap Inc., which is headquartered less than a mile away on the Embarcadero, operates multiple flagship and full-line stores for The Gap, Banana Republic, and Old Navy in and around Union Square.

Transportation

Two cable car lines (Powell-Hyde and Powell-Mason) serve Union Square on Powell Street.

In addition, Union Square is served by many trolleybus and bus lines and the F Market heritage streetcar. The Muni Metro and BART subway systems both serve the area at nearby Powell Street Station on Market Street. In 2012, Muni began building an extension of its Muni Metro system to connect Union Square and Chinatown with Caltrain and other neighborhoods in San Francisco. After several delays, the extension, known as the Central Subway, opened in January 2023.

In popular culture
 Scenes of the square and the surrounding neighborhood were featured in Alfred Hitchcock's thriller Vertigo (1958) and the opening scene of his The Birds was filmed at the edge of the square—the character Melanie Daniels (Tippi Hedren) looks up and sees hundreds of birds flying in a circular pattern around the column at the center of the square.
 Francis Ford Coppola shot numerous scenes of The Conversation (1974) in Union Square, where the bugged conversation which forms the foundation of the movie takes place.
 Philip Kaufman's 1978 film Invasion of the Body Snatchers also features scenes of the square.
In Blake Edwards' 1962 film Days of Wine and Roses, Jack Lemmon (as Joe Clay) looks at his reflection in the window of the Union Square Lounge on Maiden Lane and realizes he is an alcoholic "bum."

See also

 49-Mile Scenic Drive
 List of upscale shopping districts
 Theatre District, San Francisco

References

External links

 Union Square's official website
 360 degree panoramic photographs of San Francisco's Union Square, from Don Bain's 360° Panoramas

 
California Historical Landmarks
Economy of San Francisco
Entertainment districts in California
Neighborhoods in San Francisco
Shopping districts and streets in the United States
Shopping malls established in 1988
Shopping malls in San Francisco
Squares in San Francisco
Tourist attractions in San Francisco